The women's 200 metre breaststroke event at the 2016 Summer Olympics took place on 10–11 August at the Olympic Aquatics Stadium.

Summary
Japan's Rie Kaneto pulled away from a tightly-packed field over a wide margin to become the country's third gold medalist in the event's history, since Hideko Maehata topped the podium in 1936, and Kyoko Iwasaki in 1992. She swam through the final lap to a decisive gold-medal triumph in 2:20.30, but fell short of her attempt to overhaul a sub-2:20 range at the Games. Russia's Yuliya Yefimova launched a late charge on the home stretch to get her second silver of the meet in 2:21.97. Meanwhile, China's Shi Jinglin rebounded from an out-of-medal feat in the 100 m breaststroke three days earlier to earn the bronze with a 2:22.28, beating Great Britain's Chloe Tutton (2:22.34) by just six hundredths of a second.

Australia's Taylor McKeown seized a substantial lead through the initial half of the race, but slipped shortly off the podium to fifth in 2:22.43. Tutton's teammate Molly Renshaw, who scratched the existing British record earlier in the semifinals, picked up a sixth spot in 2:22.72. Outside the 2:22 club, Canada's Kierra Smith (2:23.19) and Denmark's world-record holder Rikke Møller Pedersen (2:23.74) rounded out the field.

Tandem Molly Hannis and Lilly King, the newly-crowned Olympic champion of the 100 m breaststroke, had put their medal hunt to an end in this event, as neither of them advanced to the final. Other notable swimmers missed the top eight roster, featuring Japan's Kanako Watanabe, the 2015 world champion, and Turkey's Viktoriya Zeynep Güneş, the fastest pre-race seed headed to the Games.

The medals for the competition were presented by Yumilka Ruiz, IOC member from Colombia, and the gifts were presented by Kazuo Sano, executive member of the FINA.

Records
Prior to this competition, the existing world and Olympic records were as follows.

Competition format

The competition consisted of three rounds: heats, semifinals, and a final. The swimmers with the best 16 times in the heats advanced to the semifinals. The swimmers with the best 8 times in the semifinals advanced to the final. Swim-offs were used as necessary to break ties for advancement to the next round.

Results

Heats

Semifinals

Semifinal 1

Semifinal 2

Final

References

Women's 00200 metre breaststroke
Olympics
2016 in women's swimming
Women's events at the 2016 Summer Olympics